Selina Cerci (born 31 May 2000) is a German footballer who plays as a forward for 1. FC Köln and the Germany national team.

Career
Cerci made her international debut for Germany in the 2022 Arnold Clark Cup on 17 February 2022, coming on as a substitute in the 78th minute for Jule Brand against Spain. The match finished as a 1–1 draw.

Career statistics

International

References

External links
 
 
 
 

2000 births
Living people
Sportspeople from Kiel
Footballers from Schleswig-Holstein
German women's footballers
Germany women's international footballers
FC Bayern Munich (women) players
SV Werder Bremen (women) players
1. FFC Turbine Potsdam players
Frauen-Bundesliga players
2. Frauen-Bundesliga players

Association football forwards
Women's association football forwards